Vivah is a 2019 Indian Bhojpuri-language romantic drama film written and directed by Manjul Thakur and jointly produced by Pradeep Singh, Nishant Ujjwal and Pratik Singh. Its star Pradeep Pandey aka Chintu, Sanchita Benarjee and Akanksha Awasthi in lead roles, while Awdhesh Mishra, Sanjay Mahanand, Ritu Pandey, Lalit Upadhyay, Anita Rawat, Maya Yadav, Shweta Verma, Arbind Tiwari and others in supporting roles. Pakhi Hegde and Kajal Raghwani make special appearance in songs.

Cast
Pradeep Pandey "Chintu" as Anand Babu
Sanchita Benarjee as Nandini
Akanksha Awasthi as Sandhya
Awadhesh Mishra as Manohar Babu (Anand's father)
Ritu Pandey as Sunanda (Anand's mother)
Kiran Yadav as Nirmala Bua
 Lalit Upadhyay as Narayan Babu (Nandini's father)
Sanjay Mahanand as Kanhaiya
 Anita Rawat as Laxmi Devi (Nandini's mother)
 Shweta Verma as Anand's sister-in-law
 Arbind Tiwari as Pandit Ji
Pakhi Hegde as special appearance in a song
Kajal Raghwani as special appearance in a song

Production

Release
The film theatrically released on 25 October 2019 on occasion of Diwali across Maharashtra, Gujarat, Delhi, Eastern Uttar Pradesh, Punjab and West Bengal. In Mumbai film broken records on box office. Vivah is the first Bhojpuri that has become superhit by entering all theaters of Mumbai in the second week.

Film also released in Bihar, Jharkhand and Nepal on 1 November 2019 occasion of Chhath. After Mumbai it also break all records of Bhojpuri box office in Bihar. The film was first commercial hit of 2019.

Music

The soundtrack of Vivah was composed by Chhote Baba and Madhukar Anand with lyrics written by Rajesh Mishra, Sumit Chandravanshi, Santosh Puri and Arbind Tiwari. It is produced under the "Enter10 Music Bhojpuri" company, who also bought his digital satellite rights.

Marketing
First-look poster of "Vivah"  is released on 30 July 2019.

The trailer and music of this film was launched on 1 October 2019 at Big Hotel, Mumbai in the presence of actor Ravi Kishan, Abhay Sinha, Rajkumar R. Pandey, Parag Patil and others. Trailer released on same day on YouTube official handel of Yashi Films and Enter10 Music Bhojpuri.

References

2019 films
2010s Bhojpuri-language films